Larry N. Larson (born 29 December 1935) is an American politician.

Larry Larson was born in Spring Valley, Minnesota, to parents Guy and Esther Larson on 29 December 1935. He attended Hampton Grade School, and graduated from Ames High School in Ames, Iowa, in 1954. Larson then was a student at Iowa State University for the next four years, where he completed a bachelor's degree. Following his college graduation, Larson served in the United States Army for three years. In 1961, Larson opened a grocery store. He won election to the Iowa House of Representatives in 1970, and was seated as a Democratic legislator from District 34. Larson contested the 1972 and 1974 elections as a Democratic candidate for District 42, losing both times to Reid W. Crawford.

References

1935 births
Living people
20th-century American politicians
United States Army soldiers
Military personnel from Iowa
American grocers
Democratic Party members of the Iowa House of Representatives
Ames High School alumni
Iowa State University alumni
People from Spring Valley, Minnesota
Politicians from Ames, Iowa
Candidates in the 1972 United States elections
Candidates in the 1974 United States elections